Róbert Gönczi (29 October 1951 – 30 November 2000) was a Hungarian boxer. He competed in the men's featherweight event at the 1980 Summer Olympics. At the 1980 Summer Olympics, he lost to Titi Cercel of Romania.

References

External links
 

1951 births
2000 deaths
Hungarian male boxers
Olympic boxers of Hungary
Boxers at the 1980 Summer Olympics
People from Törökbálint
Featherweight boxers
Sportspeople from Pest County
20th-century Hungarian people